Wolfgang Gayer (born 9 January 1943 in Germany) is a German retired footballer who last played for LASK in Austria.

Career

Gayer started his senior career with SC Neckarstadt. In 1969, he signed for Hertha BSC in the German Bundesliga, where he made one-hundred and six appearances and scored thirty-two goals. After that, he played for Durban City, Hellenic,  TSV 1860 Munich, and LASK.

References

External links 
 How Hertha professional Wolfgang Gayer found refuge in South Africa after the 1971 Bundesliga scandal: The unfinished 
 "Mozart" with Lampertheim roots 
 What happened to ... Wolfgang "Uwe" Gayer? 
 A special day for Gayer 
 FuPa Profile

German footballers
Hertha BSC players
1943 births
Living people
Expatriate soccer players in South Africa
Borussia Neunkirchen players
Durban City F.C. players
Hellenic F.C. players
TSV 1860 Munich players
LASK players
West German expatriate footballers
Expatriate footballers in Austria
Association football midfielders
West German expatriate sportspeople in South Africa
West German expatriate sportspeople in Austria